Rochestown railway station was on the Cork, Blackrock and Passage Railway in Rochestown, County Cork, Ireland.

History

The station opened as Douglas on 8 June 1850. On 1 April 1856 it was renamed Rochestown.

Passenger services were withdrawn on 12 September 1932.

Routes

Further reading

References

Disused railway stations in County Cork
Railway stations opened in 1850
Railway stations closed in 1932

Railway stations in the Republic of Ireland opened in 1850